Gerusalemme is a station on Line 5 of the Milan Metro which opened on 26 September 2015.

History 
The works for the construction of the station began in 2010, as part of the second section of the line, from Garibaldi FS to San Siro Stadio. It opened on 26 September 2015.

Station structure 
Gerusalemme is an underground station with two tracks served by an island platform and, like all the other stations on Line 5, is wheelchair accessible.

References

Line 5 (Milan Metro) stations
Railway stations opened in 2015
2015 establishments in Italy
Railway stations in Italy opened in the 21st century